Brian Quinn may refer to:

 Brian Quinn (businessman), disgraced Australian businessman
 Brian Quinn (comedian) (born 1976), American comedian, television star and member of The Tenderloins
 Brian Quinn (economist) (born 1936), Scottish economist and former Celtic F.C. chairman
 Brian Quinn (hurler) (born 1972), Irish hurler
 Brian Quinn (soccer) (born 1960), Irish-American soccer player